Amasa is an unincorporated community and census-designated place (CDP) in southern Hematite Township, Iron County, Michigan, in the United States. As of the 2010 census it had a population of 283.

History 
Amasa was named for Amasa Stone of Cleveland, Ohio. It was formed by mostly Finnish settlers, and was primarily a mining town. It was originally named "Hemlock," but was renamed to Amasa in 1892. The community has a general store called Tall Pines, a museum, and a restaurant called the Rusty Sawblade.

Geography
U.S. Highway 141 passes through the forested town, leading north  to Covington and south  to Crystal Falls, the Iron County seat.

The Hemlock River, a tributary of the Paint River and part of the Menominee River watershed flowing to Lake Michigan, flows from northeast to southwest through Amasa.

Demographics

Notable People 

 Jim Christensen, a folk singer-songwriter, is from Amasa. He released his album "Heart Winds" in 1998.

References

Unincorporated communities in Iron County, Michigan
Populated places established in 1890
Unincorporated communities in Michigan
Census-designated places in Iron County, Michigan
Census-designated places in Michigan